Thomas Turino (born December 12, 1951) is an American ethnomusicologist and author of several textbooks in the field, most notably the popular introductory book Music as Social Life: The Politics of Participation. His interests include the growth of nationalism through music  and the role that music plays in creating the connections that define a society.

References

Living people
1951 births
American musicologists